Chiltan Adventurers Association Balochistan (CAAB) is a non-profit government adventure sports association in Balochistan, Pakistan. It consists of young boys and girls dedicated to the promotion of mountain adventure, sports climbing and associated sports. Its goals are to protect the new generation from dangerous drug abuse, by providing them with healthy sporting opportunities, organizing training camps, and national and provincial level event expeditions. 95% of all the players receiving training from CAAB are students of schools and colleges in Balochistan. The activities of the CAAB are financed by self-help, donations, and subscriptions of members and annual grant-in-aid from Balochistan Sports Control Board (BSCB) Quetta.

History

The association is affiliated, at the international level, with the representative of the British C. R. Association 'Orpheus Caving Club' (UK), UIS (USA), Speleo Club Du liban (Lebanon) SCDL and at the national level with Alpine Club of Pakistan.

International Participation

Pakistan National Speleo and caving team selected by Chiltan Adventurers Association Balochistan headed by Hayatullah Khan Durrani participated in the 1st and 2nd International Geosciences (Speleology) Congresses "in Iran as National Speleo and Caving team leader of Pakistan 2014 and 2016.The National Speleological and Caving Team of Pakistan headed by Hayatullah Khan Durrani (founder and Patron CAAB) as team leader Participate in the 5th European Speleo Caving (Eurospeleo Conference 2016) Yorkshire and 10th PAK-Britain Friendship Caving and Speleo Expedition 13 to 31 August 2016 under the patronage of BCA British Caving Association and Orpheus Caving Club Derby-shire United Kingdom. the President PCRCF also attended the Bureau meeting of International Union of Speleology held in Yorkshire,"

Silver Jubilee of the Chiltan Adventurers
The celebrations of the silver jubilee of the Chiltan Adventurers Association Balochistan took place in October, 2010. The first and second phases of the competitive rock-climbing events for boys and girls, successfully ended here in the Mountains of Hanna Lake, Quetta. Fifty-five male and female mountaineers participated in the events.

Minister of Sport, Mir Shah Nawaz Khan Marri, and Minister of Prosecutions, Miss Rahillah Hameed Durrani (T.I.) were Guest of Honour of the Prize and Certificate distribution ceremony. Hayatullah Khan Durrani (Pride-of-Performance) founder of the Chiltan Adventures Association, chief organizer of the events and programmes, and Agha Faisal Shah President of the association, appraised the activities of the Chiltan Adventurers held over the past 26 years, 1984–2010.

Prime Minister Award for Abubakar Durrani of Chiltan Adventurers
On 2 November 2010, Prime Minister of the Islamic Republic of Pakistan, Yousaf Raza Gillani, awarded the Youth adventurer and Canoeist Award to Mohammad Abubakar Durrani of the Chiltan Adventurers & HDWSA.

K2 Base Camp Expedition

After the successful Pakistani-Italian friendship expedition July 2004, on returning home by bus from Skardu to Rawalpindi, five mountaineers of this expedition were killed in a bus accident near Kohistan. They were Abdul Samad Khilji, Mohammad Ali Khan Mandokhail, Syed Thaimoor Shah, Nasibullah Khilji and Waqas Ahmed.

Construction of CAAB Martyrs Monument
In memory of the five national heroes, who were killed in a bus accident after returning home from K-2 Expedition on 8 August 2004, Martyr's Monument was erected by the CAAB. The monument was constructed on the front of mission road roundabout opposite to the IG police office Quetta. The place for the construction of this monument was allotted by the Quetta Cantonment Board. This monument was proposed and designed by the CAAB founder and patron Hayatullah Khan Durrani, Chairman Malik Abdul Rahim and Miss Rahillah Hameed Durrani, assisted by Arzgwani Architects of Quetta. Funds for the construction were allocated by Miss Rahillah Hameed Durrani, Provincial Minister and Patron of the Chiltan Adventurers.

Juniper Defender Award

On 25 October 2010, The Government of Balochistan Sports, Environment and Youth Affairs Departments announced the Silver Jubilee "Juniper Defender Award" to Mr. Hayatullah Khan Durrani, for his long standing efforts since 1984.
He is an environmental analyst for the preservation of the 3000-year-old World Heritage of Juniperus macropoda Juniper forests and wildlife in the Ziarat and Zarghoon Ghar regions of Balochistan Pakistan. He established the Juniper Defenders center at Chautair Valley of Ziarat, to educate people, create awareness and stop the destruction of this valuable heritage and its endangered species.

References

External links
 Official website of the Chiltan Adventurers

1948 establishments in Pakistan
Mountaineering in Pakistan
Organisations based in Quetta
Sports organisations of Pakistan
Volunteer search and rescue organizations